Jennifer Lyn Morris  (born 20 September 1972) is a non-executive director of Sandfire Resources. Born on 20 September 1972 in Maryborough, Queensland, Morris is a former field hockey defender, who was a member of the Australian Women's Hockey Team, best known as the Hockeyroos, that won the gold medal at the 1996 Summer Olympics in Atlanta, Georgia. Four years later she was on the squad, winning the title, this time at home in Sydney, Australia. Making her international debut in 1992, Morris was famous for her penalty corner.

Morris was awarded the Medal of the Order of Australia (OAM) in the 1997 Australia Day Honours.

In 2009 Morris was appointed to the board of the Fremantle Football Club.

In 2014, she was appointed as a Human Capital Consulting Partner at Deloitte Australia in Perth.

In November 2016, Morris was appointed a Non-Executive Director of Fortescue Metals Group Ltd.

In 2017, Morris joined Walk Free, Minderoo Foundation's anti-slavery initiative, as the Director of Business and Government Engagement. Shortly after this she was appointed Chief Executive Officer.

Morris left Walk Free in 2019.

References

External links
 
 Australian Olympic Committee

1972 births
Living people
Australian female field hockey players
Field hockey players at the 1996 Summer Olympics
Field hockey players at the 2000 Summer Olympics
Olympic field hockey players of Australia
Olympic gold medalists for Australia
People from Maryborough, Queensland
Olympic medalists in field hockey
Fremantle Football Club administrators
Medalists at the 2000 Summer Olympics
Medalists at the 1996 Summer Olympics
Recipients of the Medal of the Order of Australia
20th-century Australian women
Sportswomen from Queensland
Field hockey people from Queensland